Destiny Clark  is an interracial American singer-songwriter, musician, actress, model, and a former beauty pageant titleholder from Gaithersburg, Maryland. Destiny was crowned Miss Maryland 2015 and competed for the Miss America 2016 title in September 2015. Currently, she is a Montessori preschool teacher and is a social media musical influencer and songwriter focused on the subjects of female empowerment and self-discovery.

Biography & Career

Early life
Born in the Bronx, NY and adopted as a baby, Destiny has been entertaining and performing from a young age and writing songs and plays since Kindergarten. She was especially close to and inspired by her musical father, Charles John Clark. Her father Charles was an NYPD first responder to 9/11 when Destiny was 9; he subsequently passed away from 9/11 linked lung and throat cancer in 2009, when she was 17. His loss is one of the most formative events in her life; the loss of "rock" in her father is one of the roots of her passion for bringing attention to mental illness and its effects.

Beginning in Pageants
Destiny, especially after her father's premature passing, is from an economically disadvantaged inner-city background; she relied largely on grassroots support and local fundraising in order to use pageants as a way to further her education, raise awareness and volunteer for the causes she believes in, and advocate for her platform of "Overcoming Adversity through Self-Discovery and Mentorship". Destiny has participated in both the Miss USA and Miss America pageant systems. In October 2014, Clark was selected as a state finalist in Maryland's Miss USA pageant system. After raising the $995 entry fee through a GoFundMe campaign, Clark competed in the 2015 Miss Maryland USA pageant held October 31–November 2, 2014, placing 3rd, losing to eventual winner Mamé Adjei.

As Miss Maryland (Miss Maryland 2015) 
On January 11, 2015, Clark was crowned Miss Anne Arundel County 2015. She entered the Miss Maryland pageant at Hagerstown's Maryland Theater in June 2015 as one of 24 qualifiers for the state title. Clark's competition talent was singing her original composition "Everything Happens for a Reason" while playing a guitar. Her platform is "Forge Your Own Destiny: The Importance of Self-Discovery and Mentorship for Our Youth". Clark won the Miss Maryland competition on Saturday, June 27, 2015, when she received her crown from outgoing Miss Maryland titleholder Jade Kenny. She earned more than $10,000 in scholarship money from the state pageant. As Miss Maryland, her activities include public appearances across the state of Maryland.

Clark was dedicated to using the Miss Maryland title as a true "year of service" to her community and causes. She assisted in raising over $3M as Miss Maryland for various charities, including Children's Miracle Network Hospitals.

Miss America Contestant and "Top Talent" Award (Miss America 2016) 
Clark was Maryland's representative at the Miss America 2016 pageant in Atlantic City, New Jersey, in September 2015, In the televised finale on September 13, 2015, Clark was named the "Top Talent" and was awarded an additional $1,000 scholarship award for her original vocal and guitar performance and was awarded a $3,000 scholarship prize as her state's representative.

References

External links

Destiny Clark official homepage
Miss Maryland official website

Living people
1990s births
American beauty pageant winners
American women singer-songwriters
Miss America 2016 delegates
People from Gaithersburg, Maryland
Singer-songwriters from Maryland
21st-century American singers
American beauty pageant contestants
21st-century American composers
21st-century American women singers
21st-century women composers